George Weatherill may refer to:

 George Weatherill (politician) (1936–2021), former member of South Australian parliament
 George Weatherill (footballer) (1900–1986), Australian rules football player

See also
 George Wetherall (1788–1868), British Army officer
 George Wetherill (1925–2006), American planetary scientist